Gionvannelli is an Italian surname, derived from the given name Giovanni. Notable people with the surname include:

Benedetto Giovannelli (1602–1676), architect
Leonida Nikolai Giovannelli (1906–198?), Italian/Manx writer and cultural activist
Miriam Giovanelli (born 1989), Italian/Spanish actress and model
Paolo Giovannelli (born 1960), former professional footballer
Riccardo Giovanelli (born 1946), astronomer
Ruggiero Giovannelli (c. 1560 – 1625), composer

Italian-language surnames
Patronymic surnames
Surnames from given names